Arun Kumar Sarma is the Director General at North East Centre for Technology Application and Reach, and a former Professor and Dean at Vellore Institute of Technology.

Education and career 
Sarma completed his MSc in Physics from Gauhati University. After completing his undergraduate degree, he received his PhD from the Institute of Advance Study in Science and Technology at Gauhati University. Sarma conducted his post doctoral research at the Institute of Space and Astronautical Science, Japan, and then worked as a scientist at the Centre of Plasma Physics.

He was an assistant professor in Birla Institute of Technology Mesra, and a professor and dean at Pandit Deendayal Petroleum University. He then became a professor and dean at Vellore Institute of Technology.

Fellowships 
He was the recipient of many fellowships

 BOYSCAST DST Government of India
 AAAPT Research Training from Chinese Academy of Sciences
 CoE fellowship from Ministry of Education Culture Sports Science and Technology Japan
 Indian National Science Academy bilateral exchange program
 Indian National Science Academy visiting fellow

Research 
Sarma's research interests lie in plasma physics, thin film coating on metal, semiconductors and textiles. He has a few patents and has published many research papers. He has also collaborated with foreign universities from Austria, France, Japan, Nepal, Thailand, and the UK.

References 

Indian plasma physicists
Gauhati University alumni
Academic staff of Birla Institute of Technology, Mesra
Academic staff of Pandit Deendayal Energy University
Academic staff of Vellore Institute of Technology
Year of birth missing (living people)
Living people